Chapters of Lambda Phi Epsilon include Active undergraduate groups, one active Alumni chapter, active Associate chapters with a Greek Letter name (indicating they were once full chapters) and Associate chapters that have yet to be assigned a chapter designation.  These are named for their institution.  

Full chapters that have closed are listed as Dormant, as are associate chapters that did not emerge as full chapters.  

Several chapter names are unused, and are listed as Reserved.

Chapters
This is the chapter list of Lambda Phi Epsilon. Active chapters or Associate groups are listed in bold, inactive groups listed in italics.

References

External links
Lambda Phi Epsilon National Fraternity, Inc

chapters
Lambda Phi Epsilon